Protek is a Russian company that includes drug manufacturing, retail, and distribution. It is one of the largest pharmaceutical companies of Russia. It was founded in 1990 by Vadim Yakunin and Grigor Khachaturov.

See also 
 Pharmaceutical industry in Russia

References 

Pharmaceutical companies of Russia
Russian companies established in 1990
Companies based in Moscow
Companies listed on the Moscow Exchange